Dethick Manor is a 16th-century manor house, situated at Dethick, Amber Valley, Derbyshire, much altered in the 18th century and converted to use as a farmhouse. It is a Grade II* listed building.

The manor of Dethick was anciently owned by the eponymous family. On the death in 1403 of Robert Dethick, the heir to the family's property at Dethick (though not the last Dethick male - the family owned land in Breadsall and Newhall in Derbyshire),  the property passed to Thomas Babington who had married Isabel, the elder of Robert's two daughters. Babington was the son of Sir John Babington and nephew of Sir William Babington, Chief Justice in 1423.

The son of Isabel and Thomas, Sir John Babington of Dethick (High Sheriff of Derbyshire in 1479) died in 1485 at the Battle of Bosworth Field. His son Thomas and his grandson Anthony both served as High Sheriff.

The manor house, dating from the 15th century, was rebuilt by the Babington family in the 16th century. Sir Anthony Babington, born at the manor house in 1561, was attained and executed for High Treason for his part in the Babington Plot. As a result of his earlier transfer of ownership to his younger brother the sequestration of the estate was avoided.

In the 17th century the Babingtons sold the property. Later owners included Blackwell and Hallowes. The house was eventually used as a farmhouse and was substantially altered and extended for that purpose in the 18th century. Substantial elements of the 15th-century manor house remain incorporated into the present structure.

The manor farm was supplemented by the adjoining church farm, which an 1891 source describes as follows: "The church of St. John the Baptist is a small edifice of stone, dating from 1220, and consists of chancel, nave and a lofty western tower, dated 1535, containing one small bell: there are three memorial windows, and 60 sittings. ... The soil is sandy; subsoil, gritstone. The chief crops are wheat, barley, oats and about one-half the land is in pasture. The acreage is 1,826; rateable value, £4,748; the population in 1881 was 1,036." In 1530-32, Anthony Babington raised the original 13th-century roof by means of clerestory windows and added the unusual tower, distinctive of Dethick.

From 2008 to 2021, Dethick Manor Farm had been owned by the television presenter Simon Groom. He and his wife ran the  farm. The Grooms have since sold the property.

Goldie, Simon's dog who appeared alongside him on Blue Peter, is buried on the grounds of Dethick Manor Farm.

References

English Heritage : Images of England, photograph and architectural description of listed building
Magna Britannia Vol 5 Derbyshire (1817) British-History Online.
History, Gazetteer and Directory of Derbyshire Samuel Bagshawe (1846) p629 Google Books.
A History of the Dethick family of Dethick 1200-1918 Janet Kinrade Dethick Lulu.com 2008

Country houses in Derbyshire
Grade II* listed buildings in Derbyshire
History of Derbyshire